Eremo di San Domenico (Italian for Hermitage of San Domenico) is an hermitage located in Villalago, Province of L'Aquila (Abruzzo, Italy).

History

Architecture

References

External links

 

Domenico
Villalago